Catherine Rebecca Gray (or Grey), Lady Manners, later Lady Huntingtower (1766 – 21 March 1852) was an Anglo-Irish aristocrat and poet.

Life
Catherine Gray was born in Lehena, County Cork, the daughter of Francis Gray and his wife, Elizabeth Ruddock, and was brought up in Cork, Ireland. In 1790 she married the Tory politician William Manners. The pair had six sons and six daughters. In 1821, the family surname was changed from Manners to Tollemache (also spelt Talmash). William died in 1833 and in 1840 their son Lionel inherited the Earldom of Dysart from his grandmother. All his siblings were raised to the precedence of the children of an earl, to reflect their father's position had he survived.

The first collection of poems under Lady Manners' own name was published in 1790, and their author was described as having "claims ... to the praise of harmony of verse and purity of sentiment ... not exceeded by those of any among her fair contemporaries". Her poetry was popular during the early nineteenth century.

Works
 Poems by Lady Manners, 1793
 Review of Poetry, Ancient and Modern, A Poem, by Lady M****, 1799

References

External links
 Catherine Rebecca Grey, Lady Manners at the Eighteenth-Century Poetry Archive (ECPA)

1766 births
1852 deaths
Irish poets
Irish women poets
18th-century British poets
Year of birth uncertain
People from Cork (city)
18th-century Irish women writers
18th-century Irish writers
Tollemache family
British courtesy baronesses and ladies of Parliament